The diagnostic enterprise method is a management theory whose methods were created based on Frederick Winslow Taylor's principles to develop new ways in which companies can change their internal structure without outside help. Some of the techniques bring the managers the advantage to find opportunity areas in the company to correct them without affecting the enterprise development. This methods can be applied without big costs in money, time and training. This method can be applied to almost any enterprise.

Frederick Taylor
Frederick Winslow Taylor is considered the father of scientific management. Taylor evolved from a simple floor worker to be the boss in a former company. He considered that the management techniques would determine the best way to divide the tasks inside an enterprise. The methods developed by Taylor began with experiments counting the time it takes for a machine to produce an object. He thought that this method could be applied to every worker in the enterprise. This method came when the economy and the efficiency of the enterprise was below the standards.

Taylor's steps of management
Taylor established four principles to increase efficiency at the workplace. Although these principles were established a long time ago they are still used to resolve efficiency problems. The First principle is to analyze the way in which every worker does the task given. With all the information united, build a new improved plan of activities. This principle is based in the study of time-cost and time of delivery. The second principle consists in making a new method and give it as a written rule to be a standard for working. If the method is written down and given to the workers they can learn it and apply it in their work area. The third principle is that according to needs, chose the best workers that have the abilities and that can be trained to follow the standard rules. When a worker has the knowledge he can do his tasks better and achieve the goals asked. Fourth principle is to create a common goal between the workers and make a pay system to reward the ones above the common goal. With this principle the employees would work with more efficiency and do it with auto satisfaction. From these principles we deduce that every place in the enterprise costs money, so it is necessary to complete the labor analysis technique.

Although the Frederick Taylor's original technique is still used, other methods' variations have been developed from it. These methods are also effective.  Each one has a different process, but the main goal is to get the objectives. By knowing the different types of methods, people can use it as a strategic plan that will give an extra value against the competition.

Derivatives of Taylor's original method

Labor Analysis
The labor analysis came from the prior techniques of Frederick Taylor. The main difference is that this technique is focus on how a job position is developed in order to work with precise instructions. This diagnostic implies the actions to direct and correct the enterprise that is guided. As managers, they should identify and understand their workers to improve their abilities inside the enterprise. For a better knowledge of the problem the worker should know the main reason of his position and how to develop it in the company. The manager should establish each role of the company. In this way the relationship between the workers is promoted. The elements of the labor analysis are: First is the definition of position. In this step is named the actual position where is located in the enterprise. Who are the immediate bosses? Is another boss in the area? Are there any external people working? Second step is the general description that consists in five words describe the work done in the position. Third step is specific description. In this part the obligations and their daily activities are described. Sometimes the eventual and periodical activities need to be specified. The fourth step are objectives. The main objectives need to be quantified. An objective should follow the next conditions: An infinitive verb plus a percentage of main goals, with a specific date and the operations costs.

Harvard Method and the Harvard Case Method
This method was developed by the Harvard Business School were is used in the Management Business Academy course based on the Frederick Taylor principles. The case presented is longer than the MIT method, but also presents the important facts of the problem like the Short Facts Method that is more simple. It is considered a classic method because it is the most used by enterprises. The enterprises use this method by creating their own case with the information of their company so every employee can understand the problems that the company has so everyone can help to find the solutions. That is why enterprises need to create the conditions needed for automotivation in order to have better results from their employees. The Harvard Business School students use this case in order to understand the problems that they can find outside the school in their real job, so they read and analyze different cases to be prepared in the business world. Each student need to take the initiative to search for more information that can be helpful to do the analysis. It has been proven that this method help the students to learn with automotivation.

The Harvard Case Method consist in four steps in which is apply the information the case present. The first step is fact analysis where the employees and managers that are analyzing the case writes the facts presented on the case without opinions. The second step is problem diagostic in which is described the problems that are presented on the case starting with the most important to solve. The third step is analysis of possible solutions where the possibility of each solution is seen as the way that can if it really can help to solve the problem. Finally, the fourth step consists in choosing one of the options presented on the step three that best solves the case. This method promote the search of answers inside the person not on the external facts. The main reason is that there is no solution or correct answers so there is an opportunity to learn from others. With the exposure of possible solutions in group you can learn with and from all the group, that is why it is effective, because the social learning effect.

Short Facts Method
This method is mostly applied by managers and supervisors based on Frederick Taylor method. The short facts method begins with a case no longer than four paragraphs in which a simple problem is described. Later on, the case is analyzed by the group of employees and managers of the enterprise. Then after finding the main facts, the group starts a discussion to find the possible solutions. At the end with a brainstorm they choose the best solution that can be apply to their own company. The main reason to use this method is because with the case based on the company all the employees and managers can have more ideas to find a solution to the problem that is reflected on the case and the employees can learn more about how to change their own company.

MIT Method
The MIT method is influenced by the Harvard Method but improved for the engineers to apply it in the enterprise is also another option for engineers to diagnose their enterprise without needing a business advisor. The engineers who might be on the group need an individual reading and research about the case given after the group session. Also for the session, they need to already do an analysis and a possible solution to compare it with the group. On each session the engineers will be guided by an instructor. All the engineers ask questions to the instructor to have more information about the case solution. At the end before the session is over the instructor tell the group what solution was near the correct answer and finally he gives the correct solution. In some cases the group decides what is the best solution according to all the proposals given in the session. Even though this method need more preparation, it is a good opportunity to improve the engineers' individual abilities.

System Analysis Method
The strategic analysis method is based on the elements or subsystems. This technique is based on prior methods of Frederick Taylor. These subsystems are related to the entire enterprise plan, so if one is changed in modification all the enterprise. This method is divided in four steps. First step is the mission determination in which the managers decide what they want as an enterprise, to be accomplished, what is the main purpose of the company. In this step is also include the principles that will guide the enterprise. The second step is environmental assessment. It is divided in external, determining threats and opportunities, and internal, determining strengths and weaknesses. The third step is objective setting where you create specific goals to the enterprise that can be measurable, achievable, time specific and documented. Finally the fourth step is strategy setting is when the managers create a strategy plan based on the steps before that creates the balance in the company.

International implementations
The above methods are primarily used in the United States. However, these methods are also applied in other countries such as Mexico and India. These countries were chosen because they are good examples of developed countries with high expectations in the future. In the case of México, there can be found more influences of the United States because they use the Harvard Case Method. What it is really interesting is that even though they applied the same method the improving impact is bigger in México than in the United States. While in India being the youngest country in the world brings a good opportunity to understand their business and how to enter from other parts of the world.

Mexico
For Mexico, the method used to diagnostic an enterprise is the case method. This method allows each person in the group to give ideas and possible solutions to the problem established. In Mexico people tend to be afraid of business and they need everyone’s opinion before they feel secure and close a business. But each participant gives his conclusions according to the knowledge he has and the experiences. In this method teamwork is very important. Everyone should collaborate in the conclusion and bring new ideas, even if they are out of this world. For PYMES, the government has created a web page in which the owners can search for useful information about small businesses.

India
India is a developing country has been growing in the business part. India exports increased from $13,586 million US dollars in August 2009, to $16,644 million US dollars in August 2010. Small and medium enterprises (SME) had become one of the strongest points in the economy.  The SME is an alternative for the entrepreneur people that have the management abilities and an entrepreneur vision. People following these ideas are creating small enterprises that satisfy a necessity between the consumers and that they are capable of filling. When this enterprises have problems they could use the same method showed here to diagnose the problem and solve it.

By using cases and using the management skills we could develop more skills for helping enterprises. For example, in India, two graduate students began their SME with an IT program in 1998. They started as consultants and then developed their IT enterprise as a web product company. Their strategy was to build a global internet business that could allow people to buy services rather than physical products.  By this time the internet was not as common as it is right not. It was monopolized by BSNL, but they were not stopped by the government because soon after it broke down. Without any assessment or business diagnostic enterprise method they would not continue in the market.

References

Management